Gemma Arró Ribot  (born 28 August 1980) is a Catalan ski mountaineer, born in Puigcerdà. She started ski mountaineering in 2003 and competed for the first time at the Cronoescalada Pas de la Casa race.

Selected results 
 2006:
 5th, World Championship relay race together with Naila Jornet Burgada, Izaskun Zubizarreta Guerendiain and Cristina Bes Ginesta
 2007:
 6th, European Championship relay race together with Maribel Martín de la Iglesia and Izaskun Zubizarreta Guerendiain
 8th,European Championship team race together with Izaskun Zubizarreta Guerendiain
 2008:
 5th, World Championship relay race together with Cristina Bes Ginesta, Izaskun Zubizarreta Guerendiain und Emma Roca Rodríguez
 2009:
 4th, European Championship relay race together with Mireia Miró Varela and Izaskun Zubizarreta Guerendiain
 7th European Championship vertical race
 2010:
 4th, World Championship relay race (together with Mireia Miró Varela and Cristina Bes Ginesta)
 4th, World Championship team race (together with Mireia Miró Varela)
 6th, World Championship single race
 6th, World Championship combination ranking
 8th, World Championship vertical race
 2011:
 3rd, World Championship vertical race
 3rd, World Championship relay (together with Cristina Bes Ginesta and Mireia Miró Varela)
 6th, World Championship team race (together with Marta Riba Carlos)
 2012:
 2nd, European Championship team, together with Mireia Miró Varela
 2nd, European Championship relay, together with Marta Riba Carlos and Mireia Miró Varela 	
 3rd, European Championship vertical race
 5th, World Championship vertical, combined ranking
 4th, 2012 Crested Butte Ski Mountaineering Race, sprint, single and total ranking

Patrouille des Glaciers 

 2010: 9th (and 5th in the "civilian women" ranking), together with Marta Riba Carlos and Naila Jornet Burgada

External links 
 Gemma Arró Ribot at Skimountaineering.org

References 

1980 births
Living people
Ski mountaineers from Catalonia
People from Cerdanya (comarca)
Spanish female ski mountaineers
Sportspeople from the Province of Girona